Colaspedusa is a genus of leaf beetles in the subfamily Eumolpinae, found in Southeast Asia.

Species
 Colaspedusa bicoloripes Medvedev, 1998
 Colaspedusa houaphanica Moseyko & Romantsov, 2022
 Colaspedusa verrucosa Medvedev & Zoia, 2001

References

Eumolpinae
Chrysomelidae genera
Beetles of Asia